The 2017 World Snowshoe Championships was the 10th edition of the global snowshoe running competition, World Snowshoe Championships, organised by the World Snowshoe Federation and took place in Saranac Lake, New York from 24 to 25 February 2017.

Results
The race, held on the distance of 8 kilometers, has compiled 16 different rankings, in addition to the two (male and female) overall, another 14 for the various categories masters.

Male Overall

Female Overall

References

External links
 World Snowshoe Federation official web site

World Snowshoe Championships